Allied London is a property development and investment company that develops landmark projects ranging from re-use to regeneration developments across retail, commercial, office, residential, restaurant, and leisure sectors. The company also offers rental options. They own several buildings in the Spinningfields area of Manchester, as well as Glasgow, Leeds and London.

History 
The company was founded in 1909 and became a private company with Michael Ingall as its CEO from September 2000.

Properties
Allied London's properties include:

Manchester 

 The Bonded Warehouse
The Old Granada Studios
London Road Fire Station
 Civil Justice Centre
Castlefield House
 Spinningfields
 Hardman Square
 3 Hardman Street
 The Lawns
 The Avenue
 The Avenue North
 Tower 12
 Leftbank

Leeds 

 Leeds Dock

London
 Aldersgate
 Brunswick Centre
 20 Cannon Street
 Poplar, London
 Herbal House
 28 Savile Row

Glasgow 
 Skypark

The hello Project 
In April 2014, Allied London launched hello Work, to provide hot desking, co-working and studios alongside a community and events programme for SMEs.

References

External links 
 Allied London
 hello Work

Property companies of the United Kingdom
Companies based in Manchester